Rec (stylized as [•REC]; short for "record") is a 2007 Spanish found footage horror film co-written and directed by Jaume Balagueró and Paco Plaza. The film stars Manuela Velasco as a reporter who, with her cameraman, accompany a group of firefighters on an emergency call to an apartment building to discover an infection spreading inside, with the building being sealed up and all occupants ordered to follow a strict quarantine.

Rec was released on November 23rd, 2007 to  critical and commercial success, and is considered one of the best films in both the found footage and horror genres. Rec placed at number 60 on Time Outs list of the Top 100 Best Horror Films. The film was remade in the United States under the name Quarantine in 2008.

The film spawned the Rec film series, which includes three sequels: Rec 2 directed by Balagueró and Plaza in 2009, Rec 3: Genesis directed by Plaza in 2012, and Rec 4: Apocalypse directed by Balagueró in 2014 as the final installment in the franchise.

Plot 
Reporter Ángela Vidal and her cameraman Pablo are covering the night shift in one of Barcelona's local fire stations for the television series While You're Sleeping. While they are recording, the firehouse receives a call about an old woman, Mrs. Izquierdo, who is trapped in her apartment and screaming. Ángela and Pablo accompany two of the firefighters, Álex and Manu, to the apartment building on Rambla de Catalunya, where two police officers are waiting. As they approach, the old woman becomes aggressive and attacks one of the officers, biting his neck. As they carry the injured officer downstairs, they find the building residents gathered in the lobby. The police and military have sealed off the building and trapped them inside.

As people begin to panic, Álex, who remained upstairs with the old woman, is thrown over the staircase railings and critically injured. Mrs. Izquierdo then kills a girl, and the remaining officer, Sergio, is forced to shoot her. Ángela and Pablo begin interviewing the residents. One of the interviewees is a sick little girl named Jennifer. Her mother Mari Carmen claims she has tonsillitis, and says her dog, Max, is at the vet because he is sick as well. A health inspector in a hazmat suit arrives and attempts to treat the injured until they suddenly become extremely aggressive. After the injured are locked in the building's textile warehouse, the health inspector explains that they are infected with a virus similar to rabies, and that the disease was traced back to a dog in the apartment building, and Ángela realizes it must be Max. When the residents confront Mari Carmen, Jennifer turns, bites her mother's face and flees upstairs. Sergio handcuffs Mari Carmen to the stairs and proceeds upstairs with Manu and Pablo. They find Jennifer but she bites Sergio, who tells the others to leave him. Manu and Pablo find the remaining residents running upstairs as the infected in the warehouse have broken down the door. Gradually, more of the apartment's residents are bitten and infected.

Ángela, Pablo, and Manu, the three survivors, set out to find a key that will allow them to escape from the building via a large drain in the basement that is connected to the sewers. The apartment's infected residents start rushing them and Manu is bitten outside the apartment with the key, forcing Ángela and Pablo to take refuge in the penthouse. They discover a tape recorder which explains that the penthouse owner, an agent of the Vatican, was charged with the task of isolating an enzyme carried by a young Portuguese girl named Tristana Medeiros, whose symptoms suggest a demonic possession. As the agent attempted to treat Medeiros, the enzyme mutated and became contagious. The agent then sealed Tristana in the house to die of starvation. An infected boy within the attic damages the light on Pablo's camera, requiring Pablo to activate the camera's night vision. A now-ghoulish Tristana emerges and searches the penthouse for food. Ángela and Pablo try to escape, but Pablo is killed by Tristana and drops the camera. Ángela then picks it up and looks through the screen. Seeing Tristana eating Pablo, she panics, trips, and drops the camera. The camera continues to record as Ángela is dragged into the darkness screaming.

Cast 

Manuela Velasco as Ángela Vidal: a reporter for While You're Sleeping
Pablo Rosso as Pablo: Angela's cameraman, who records the events in the apartment
Ferrán Terraza as Manu: A firefighter dispatcher
David Vert as Álex: A firefighter dispatcher
Jorge-Yaman Serrano as Sergio: A young cop and the Older Policeman's partner
Vicente Gil as Older Policemen: A senior cop and Sergio's partner
Carlos Vicente as Guillem Marimón: A doctor who resides in the building
Carlos Lasarte as César: A tenant in the building
María Lanau as Mari Carmen: Jennifer's mother and Max's owner
Claudia Silva as Jennifer: Mari's daughter and Max's owner
Martha Carbonell as Mrs. Izquierdo: The first infected tenant in the building
Akemi Goto as Japanese Woman: A Japanese immigrant who is married to the Chinese Man
Chen Min Kao as Chinese Man: A Chinese immigrant who is married to the Japanese Woman
María Teresa Ortega as Grandmother: An Elderly resident in the apartment, and the Grandfather's wife
Manuel Bronchud as Grandfather: An Elderly resident in the apartment, and the Grandmother's husband
Javier Botet as Tristana Medeiros: A young woman who becomes Patient Zero for the virus. Due to the virus' effects, she has now transformed into a immensely tall creature
Ben Temple as Doctor: The CDC doctor who is assigned to quarantine the building
Ana Velasquez as Colombian Girl: A young tenant in the building.
Daniel Trinh as Chinese Child: The Chinese Man and Japanese Woman's young son
Marita Borrego as Firestation Dispatcher #1
Jana Prats as Firestation Dispatcher #2 (credited as Ana Prats)
Víctor Massagué as Child in Attic
Javier Coromina as Voice of Pablo

Production 
Principal photography took place in late 2006 in Barcelona, Spain

Balagueró and Plaza had previously directed the 2002 documentary OT: la película.

Release 
The film premiered in August 2007 at the 64th Venice International Film Festival, out of competition, in the opening and closing films sessions. It was also shown in October 2007 at the Sitges Film Festival and the Málaga International Week of Fantastic Cinema in November 2007, before going on general release in Spain later that month.

The film was also shown in February 2008 at the Glasgow Film Festival and the co-directors participated in a corresponding interview in which they revealed their influences during the creation of the cinema work: "Our main reference was TV; was not other films, or a tradition of previous features. I think the main influence for us was TV. What we wanted was to build a classic horror story, but, ahh, telling it in the way of a TV show." REC was then released in the United Kingdom in April 2008 and a North American DVD release occurred in 2009.

Reception 
The review aggregator website Rotten Tomatoes reports a 90% approval rating based on 40 reviews, with an average rating of 7.6/10. The site's consensus states: "Plunging viewers into the nightmarish hellscape of an apartment complex under siege, [Rec] proves that found footage can still be used as an effective delivery mechanism for sparse, economic horror."

Reviewing the film for the BBC, Jamie Russell called it "A runaway rollercoaster of a fright flick", praising the "faux-docu handheld style", and the sense of claustrophobia and confusion, claiming that "[Rec] will definitely jangle the nerves"; however, Russell criticised the lack of substance and a "one-dimensional" supporting cast. Bloody Disgusting awarded the film four-and-a-half stars out of five, with the reviewer writing, "[REC] has it all and is probably one of the best Spanish horror films in recent memory." Bloody Disgusting later ranked the film eleventh in their list of the 'Top 20 Horror Films of the Decade', with the article stating: "Out of all the 'shaky-cam' films... this one is arguably the best." In the early 2010s, Time Out conducted a poll with several authors, directors, actors, and critics who have worked within the horror genre to vote for their top horror films. Rec placed at number 54 on their top 100 list.

Accolades 
 Reaper Award 2009 
 Won: Best Indie/Foreign production 
 2008 Goya Awards (22nd edition) 
 Won: Goya Best New Actress (Manuela Velasco), Goya Best Editing (David Gallart)
 Nomination: Goya Best Special Effects (David Ambid, Enric Masip and Álex Villagrasa)  
 Fantasporto 2008
 Won: Grand Prix Fantasporto, Audience Jury Award 
 Fantastic'Arts 2008
 Won: Special Jury Prize, Youth Jury Grand Prize, Audience Award 
 Amsterdam Fantastic Film Festival 2008
 Won: Silver Scream Award
 Cinema Writers Circle Awards, Spain 2008
 Nominated: CEC Award Best Editing, CEC Award Best New Artist
 European Film Awards 2008
 Nominated: Audience Award Best Film
 Fant-Asia Film Festival 2008
 2nd place: Best European/North – South American Film Best Film, Fantasia Ground-Breaker Award Best Film 
 Festival de Cine de Sitges 2007 
 Won: Best Director Award, Best Actress Award (Manuela Velasco), Audience Award El Periódico de Catalunya – Best Motion Picture, Jose Luis Guarner Critic Award, Grand Prize of European Fantasy Film in Silver – Special Mention

Sequels 
The sequel Rec 2 premiered in September 2009 at the 66th Venice International Film Festival, and was commercially released in Spain in October of the same year. The second installment portrays the events that immediately follow the end of the first film. Actress Manuela Velasco's role of Ángela Vidal returned in the sequels Rec 2 and Rec 4: Apocalypse.

Rec 3: Genesis is the third installment of the series and was released in Spanish theaters on 30 March 2012. The conclusion of the franchise, Rec 4: Apocalypse, was released in 2014, first being screened at the Toronto Film Festival and later in Spain at the Sitges Film Festival on 3 October before being released in cinemas on 31 October.

References

External links

2007 horror films
2007 films
Spanish zombie films
2000s Spanish-language films
Demons in film
Films about infectious diseases
Found footage films
Religious horror films
Rec (film series)
Spanish supernatural horror films
Camcorder films
Films set in apartment buildings
Films set in Barcelona
Films shot in Barcelona
Films directed by Jaume Balagueró
Films directed by Paco Plaza
Films with screenplays by Jaume Balagueró
Filmax films
Castelao Producciones films
2000s Spanish films